Folmar or Folcmar may refer to:

 Folcmar (bishop) (died 990), Bishop of Utrecht
 Folmar of Karden (died 1189), Archbishop of Trier
 Brendan Folmar (born 1964), American football player
 Emory Folmar (1930 – 2011), mayor of Montgomery, Alabama
 Ryan Folmar (born 1974), American college baseball coach

See also
 Fulmar (disambiguation)